John Wesley Russell (August 31, 1923 – December 24, 2012) was an American Republican politician who served two terms as mayor of Fairfax, Virginia, in the Fairfax City Council and one term in the Virginia Senate. He defeated legislative aide Emilie F. Miller to succeed her boss, Senator Abe Brault, in 1983, but he lost the seat in a rematch four years later.

References

External links 
 

1923 births
2012 deaths
Politicians from Fairfax, Virginia
People from Madison County, Illinois
Mayors of places in Virginia
Virginia city council members
Republican Party Virginia state senators
20th-century American politicians
University of Illinois alumni
Southern Illinois University alumni
University of Illinois Urbana-Champaign alumni